Straight may refer to:

Slang
 Straight, slang for heterosexual 
 Straight-acting, an LGBT person who does not exhibit the appearance or mannerisms of the gay stereotype
 Straight, a member of the straight edge subculture

Sport and games
 Straight, an alternative name for the cross, a type of punch in boxing
 Straight, a hand ranking in the card game of poker

Places
 Straight, Oklahoma, an unincorporated community in Texas County, Oklahoma

Media
 Straight (Tobias Regner album), the first album by German singer Tobias Regner
 Straight (2007 film), a German film by Nicolas Flessa
 Straight (2009 film), a Bollywood film starring Vinay Pathak and Gul Panag
 "Straight", a song by T-Pain on the 2017 Oblivion (T-Pain album)
 "Straight", a song by A Place to Bury Strangers on the 2015 album Transfixiation
 Straight Records, a record label formed in 1969
 The Georgia Straight (straight.com), a Canadian weekly newspaper published in Vancouver, British Columbia
 Straight, the second autobiography by British artist Boy George

Other
 Straight, Inc., former name of a US drug rehabilitation program for adolescents
 Straight whiskey, pure whiskey distilled at no higher than 80% alcohol content that has been aged at least two years
 Straightedge, a drawing or cutting tool
 Straight (racing), a section of a race track
 Straight (surname)
 Straight man, a stock character
 Straight line, having zero curvature

See also 
 Strait, a body of water